RegionAlps is a railway company in the Swiss canton of Valais. It is a joint venture between Swiss Federal Railways (SBB), Transports de Martigny et Régions (TMR), and the canton of Valais. It runs passenger trains on the Simplon line between Saint-Gingolph and Brig and on the Martigny–Orsières line. It carried 9.1 million passengers in 2018, an increase of 6% over the previous year.

References

External links 
 
 

Railway companies of Switzerland
Transport in Valais
Swiss companies established in 2003
Railway companies established in 2003